Björn Svensson (born June 16, 1986) is a Swedish professional ice hockey forward, currently an unrestricted free agent who most recently played for ERC Ingolstadt in the Deutsche Eishockey Liga (DEL). He is the older brother of Magnus Pääjärvi-Svensson, who plays in the National Hockey League with the Ottawa Senators.

Svensson has played in the Swedish Hockey League with Timra IK, Modo Hockey, Malmö Redhawks and Färjestad BK. In the midst of the 2016–17 season with Färjestad BK, having appeared in 31 games and compiling just 6 points, Svensson left Sweden in agreeing to a contract for the remainder of the year with German club, ERC Ingolstadt of the DEL on January 13, 2017. Svensson added 8 points in 16 games before suffering a preliminary playoff loss with Ingolstadt to the Fischtown Pinguins to conclude his tenure with ERC.

Career statistics

Regular season and playoffs

International

References

External links

1986 births
Living people
ERC Ingolstadt players
Färjestad BK players
Malmö Redhawks players
Modo Hockey players
Moose Jaw Warriors players
Saskatoon Blades players
HC Sierre players
Swedish ice hockey forwards
Swedish people of Finnish descent
Timrå IK players